Bong Load Records is an independent record label originally based in Los Angeles which was founded by producers Tom Rothrock and Rob Schnapf and partner Bradshaw Lambert.

Much of the Bong Load Records catalog is released in small quantities. Several bands have very rare releases that are much sought after and command high prices at auctions.

Bong Load Records relaunched on its 25th anniversary in 2016 with limited edition vinyl releases. Tom Rothrock sums up the label "Our core philosophy of the indie label was always about making high quality music with artists who have dedicated their lives to their craft – artists who otherwise might not have been heard."

History 

One of Bong Load Records' biggest signings was Beck in 1991. Beck's "Loser" single became the first number one, non-major label single since FM radio became mainstream. In 1998, Beck recorded the album Mutations intended for release on Bong Load Records but it was eventually released on the Geffen label. There were a series of lawsuits between Beck, Bong Load and Geffen, settled in 1999, which led to Beck's renegotiation with Geffen. Beck released multiple titles on Bong Load including Loser, Mellow Gold, Odelay, Mutations and Midnite Vultures.

Other notable bands from the original Bong Load Custom Records include Wool, Kyuss, The Obsessed, Fatso Jetson, Elliott Smith, The Eels, L7, R.L. Burnside and  Lutefisk. Stoner rock band Fu Manchu released their first two albums via Bong Load Records.

In 2007, Rothrock briefly relaunched the label with a series of releases, including his own instrumental album Resonator.

In July 2016, Bong Load Records announced a relaunch of the label, now based in Las Vegas, with 7 limited edition vinyl releases:  The Killers (Sam’s Town - 10th Anniversary reissue), Mark Stoermer (Dark Arts), Masters of Reality (Deep In The Hole - 15th Anniversary reissue - features Chris Goss and guests Mark Lanegan, Josh Homme and members of Queens of the Stone Age and Kyuss) Elliott Smith (Figure 8, XO) and Beck (Odelay (20th Anniversary reissue), Mellow Gold).

Discography

2016
 The Killers Sam's Town (10 Year Anniversary 2LP)
 Mark Storemer Dark Arts
 Masters of Reality Deep In The Hole (15 Year Anniversary LP)
 Elliott Smith Figure 8 (2016 reissue)
 Elliott Smith XO (2016 reissue)
 Beck Mellow Gold (2016 reissue)
 Beck Odelay (20 Year Anniversary LP)

2007 
 Tom Rothrock	Resonator
 Roman Carter	Never Slow Down

2001 
 Phil Tagliere	Slow
 Richard Thompson	Action Packed
 Various	Acid Blues Remix 30 Daz
 Various	Random Hostile Takeover
 Project K	Testing Underway

2000 
 Beck	Midnite Vultures
 Elliott Smith	Figure 8
 Eels	Daisies of the Galaxy
 Dieselhed	Chico and the Flute

1999 
 Various	Stoned Again: A Bong Long Records Collection	
 Richard Thompson	Mock Tudor
 L7	Slap Happy
 Fireball Ministry	Ou est la Rock?
 Poolside	Indyglow
 Dieselhed	Elephant Rest Home
 Jon Brown	70 Years Coming (Acid Blues Label)
 Mountain Con MC Stands for Revolution (Acid Blues Label)
 Slo-Mo	Novelty (Acid Blues Label)

1998 
 Beck	Mutations
 Fatso Jetson	Toasted
 Famous Monsters	In The Night
 Elliott Smith	XO
 Sexy Death Soda	California Police State
 Sexy Death Soda	Janitor Strike
 R.L. Burnside	Roolin' & Tumblin' 
 Plastilina Mosh	Aquamosh

1996 
 Beck	Odelay
 Lutefisk	Burn in Hell Fuckers
 Andy Kaulkin	Six Foot Seven & Rising
 Lutefisk	Tin Man's Cue
 Kyuss/Wool 	Split 7" Shine/Short Term Memory Loss
 Crutch	Sold By Weight
 Vitamade	Everything You Need

1995 
 Thrush Hermit	Take Another Drag
 Quinine	 Regrets Only
 Lutefisk	Deliver from Porcelain: Themes & Variations
 The Obsessed	Altamont Nation
 Fu Manchu	Daredevil
 Vitamade	Vitamade
 Lutefisk	Aerosol

1994 
 Crutch	Disgrunted Employee
 Beck	Mellow Gold
 Beck	Steve Threw Up
 Fu Manchu	No One Rides For Free
 Wool	Box Set LP w/7"

1993 
 Beck Loser
 Wool Kill the Crow
 My Favorite Martian When The Anger's Too Strong
 Carnival of Souls	Late Bloomer

1992 
 Muzza Chunka Loaded
 Wool Mayday
 Further	Filling Station
 Grimace Quagmire

1991 
 Muzza Chunka This is a Chicken Lamp

See also
 List of record labels

References

External links 
Official Bong Load Records Site

Alternative rock record labels
American independent record labels
Indie rock record labels
Record labels based in California
Record labels established in 1996